Halfway Home is an album by guitarist Preston Reed. It marks the first instance of other musicians in an ensemble appearing on a Preston Reed recording.

Halfway Home is out of print. The title track was re-recorded in a new version on Reed's release History of Now.

Track listing
All songs by Preston Reed
 "You Are Always with Me"
 "Baroque"
 "A Wish for Peace"
 "Halfway Home"
 "Deadline"
 "Anthem"
 "Pattern Picker"
 "An Island of Your Own"
 "Pull Tap"
 "Twang"
 "Time Will Tell"

Personnel
Preston Reed – 6 & 12-string acoustic guitars, guitar synthesizer
Marc Anderson – percussion
Enrique Toussaint – bass
Gordy Knutson – drums
Phil Hey – drums
David Eiland – saxophone
Michelle Kinney – cello
Mary Danna – vocals
Cookie Van House – vocals

Production notes
Produced by Preston Reed
Engineered by Tom Mudge and Craig Thorson, and John Scherf
Assistant engineer - Paul Baron

References

1991 albums
Preston Reed albums
MCA Records albums